Ahmet Çakır (born 1964) is a Turkish politician and Mayor of Malatya since 29 March 2009.

Early life and career 
Ahmet Çakır was born in 1964 in Darende district in Malatya, Turkey. Çakır completed his primary, secondary and high school education in Darende. He graduated from faculty of economics at Anadolu University. He was a member of Malatya Independent Industrialists and Businessmen Association (MÜSİAD). Çakır is married and has two children.

Political career 
Ahmet Çakır, along with Recep Tayyip Erdoğan, co-founded the Justice and Development Party (AK Party) on August 14, 2001. In the 2009 regional elections, Çakır ran and won for the post of mayor of Malatya from the AK Party.

See also 
 Malatya

References 

Turkish politicians
1964 births
Living people